Dell Vostro is a line of business-oriented laptop and desktop computers manufactured by Dell aimed at small to medium range businesses. From 2013–2015, the line was temporarily discontinued on some Dell websites but continued to be offered in other markets, such as Malaysia and India.

Prior to Vostro, Dell's home and small business computers were sold under the same lines: Dimension for home and small business desktops, and Inspiron for home and small business portables. With the introduction of Vostro, the Dimension line was discontinued, and the Inspiron line changed to include all computers for the home market; regardless of form factor. One marked difference between the Inspiron line and the Vostro line is that the Vostro line is cheaper but comes with shorter technical support hours.

Temporary discontinuation 

In July 2013, Dell announced that they would stop manufacturing all Dell Vostro systems. Select models were made available on various Dell outlet channels for a limited time. The discontinuation of Vostro models was reportedly because of changing technology and lesser demand in the corporate world. Subsequently, the Vostro was resurrected onto the market in early 2015.

Current laptops line 

The current lineup of Vostro laptops includes Vostro 3000 series that was released on March 9, 2010, Vostro 14 5000 series that was released on October 13, 2015 and Vostro 15 5000 series released on January 20, 2017.

Please note that this list may be incomplete and some of the models that are currently being offered in some markets may be missing.

Also note that new models release on January every year (as of the latest news).

Vostro 3000

Vostro 15 (3000)  
The Vostro 15 3000 is a laptop line with a 15-inch display aimed at small and medium businesses. It is an affordable version of the 5000 15-inch line.

3558 — is a model with a 15.6 inch HD display with anti-glare aimed at small business. The operating system options are the ones offered with the Vostro 3368.
CPU: Intel Core i3 6100U, Core i3 6005U or Core i5 7200U
Display: 15.6" LED-backlit (1366×768) with anti-glare
Memory: DDR3 modules of 4 or 8 GB @ 1600 MHz
Chipset: Intel Corporation 6 Series/C200 series chipset ko (Sandy Bridge) – Intel HM67
Optical Drive: Dual-layer 8X DVD+/-CD drive
 Graphics: Intel HD 4400 or NVIDIA Geforce 2GB
 Security Hardware: Security slot
Storage: 1x SATA, 1TB HDD (5400 RPM)
Wireless: DELL Wireless N 1705 @ 2.4 GHz + Bluetooth 4.0 
Webcam: Integrated HD 720p webcam (UVC video)
Battery: 4-cell lithium-Ion
 Starting Price: $349

3578 —

Vostro 5000

Vostro 13 (53##) 

5370 —

Vostro 14 (54##) 
The Vostro 14 5000 is a laptop with a 14-inch display aimed at small business. 

5459 — Operating system options are Ubuntu or Windows (8.1 and 10), and it is compatible with Windows 7. The starting price is $550.
CPU: Intel Core i3-6100U, i5-6200U or i7-6500U
Display: 14" LED-backlit (1366×768) with anti-glare
Memory: 4 or 8 GB DDR3L @ 1600 MHz (up to 8 GB supported)
Graphics: Intel HD 520, optional Nvidia Geforce 930M, 2 GB/4GB DDR3
Security Hardware: Fingerprint reader (optional)
Storage: 1x SATA (500GB or 1TB (5400 RPM) HDD)
Wireless: Intel 3165AC + BT4.0 (802.11ac + Bluetooth 4.0, dual band 2.4&5 GHz, 1x1)
Webcam: Integrated HD 720p (1.0MP)
Battery: 43 WHr, 3-cell battery

This laptop has since been updated with Intel's Kaby Lake, Kaby Lake R and Whisky Lake processors. 

5471 — Dec. 2017 with a starting price of $776

CPU: Intel Core i5-8250U (up to 3.40GHz) or Intel Core i7-8550U (up to 4.00GHz)
Display: 14" FHD (1920 x 1080) anti-glare LED-backlit display
Memory: 8GB Up to 32GB, 2400MHz* DDR4 SoDIMM (2 slots)
Graphics: Intel UHD Graphics 620 with AMD Radeon 530 Graphics with 2GB/4GB GDDR5 vRAM
Security Hardware: Fingerprint Reader (Optional)
Storage: Dual drive config with 500GB/1TB 5400RPM hard drive + M.2 SDD solid state drive
Wireless: Intel(R) Dual Band Wireless-AC 3165 + Intel(R) Wireless Bluetooth 4.2
Webcam: Integrated 720p HD camera with microphones
Battery: 3-cell prismatic battery (42WHr)
Audio: Integrated stereo speakers (2W x 2)
HD audio enhanced with Waves MaxxAudio® Pro software
Keyboard: Backlit Keyboard

Display

5481 — Sept. 2018 with a starting price of $670.

CPU: Intel Core up to i7-8565U (4x 1.8 GHz)
Display: 14" LED-backlit (1366×768 or 1920×1080) with anti-glare
Memory: 8 GB DDR4 (up to 32 GB supported)
Graphics: Intel UHD 620, optional Nvidia GeForce MX130, 2 GB GDDR5
Security Hardware: optional fingerprint reader
Storage: 1x SATA 256GB SSD or 1TB HDD (5400 RPM), 1x M.2 (NVMe)

5491 —

Vostro 15 (55##) 

5568 — features Intel Kaby Lake microprocessors

CPU: Intel Core i5-7200U (2x 2.5 GHz, turbo boost up to 3.1 GHz)
Display: 15.6" LED-backlit (1920x1080) with anti-glare
Memory: 8 GB DDR4 @ 1600 MHz (up to 32 GB supported)
Graphics: Intel HD 620, optional Nvidia GeForce 940MX, 2 GB/4GB GDDR5
Security Hardware: fingerprint reader
Storage: 1x SATA 256GB SSD or 1TB HDD (5400 RPM)
Wireless: Intel 3165AC + BT4.0 (802.11ac + Bluetooth 4.1, dual band 2.4&5 GHz, 1x1)
Webcam: Integrated HD 720p (1.0MP)
Battery: 45 WHr, 4-cell battery

5581 — Sept. 2018, starting price is $580.

CPU: Intel Core up to i7-8565U (4x 1.8 GHz)
Display: 15.6" LED-backlit (1920x1080) with anti-glare
Memory: 8 GB DDR4 (up to 32 GB supported)
Graphics: Intel UHD 620, optional Nvidia GeForce MX130, 2 GB GDDR5
Security Hardware: fingerprint reader
Storage: 1x SATA 256GB SSD or 1TB HDD (5400 RPM), 1x M.2 (NVMe)
Battery: 45 WHr, 4-cell battery

Vostro 17 (57##) 

5770 —

Discontinued laptops

Vostro 1000 

The Vostro 1000 - 2007, is Dell's 15.4" business laptop using AMD's  Socket S1 processors.

CPU: AMD Athlon 64 X2 TK-53, Mobile AMD Sempron 3500+, 3600+
Display: 15.4" 1280x800 WXGA anti-glare
Memory: 1 GB single-channel DDR2 SDRAM @ 800 MHz, up to 2 GB dual-channel DDR2 SDRAM @ 800 MHz
Optical Drive: 8x DVD+/-R drive, 8x DVD+/-RW drive
Graphics: ATI Radeon Xpress 1150, Core: 100 MHz, Memory: 400 MHz, up to 320MB shared memory.
Storage: 1x SATA, 60 GB (5400 rpm), 80 GB (5400 rpm)
Wireless: Dell Wireless 1395
Bluetooth:
Webcam:
Battery: 4-cell lithium-ion

Vostro 1200 
The Vostro 1200 - 2007, is Dell's 12.1"

 CPU: Intel GM965 Core 2 Duo 2 MHz
 Display: 12.1" 1280x800 
 Memory: 2 GB single-channel DDR2 SDRAM @ 800 MHz or 4 GB 
 Optical Drive: 8X DVD+/-RW drive, Blu-ray disc combo drive
 Graphics: Intel GMA X3100
 Storage: 1x SATA, 160 GB (5400 RPM) HDD

Vostro 1220 
The Vostro 1220 is Dell's 12.1" business laptop based on the Intel Montevina platform.

CPU: Intel Celeron 900, Core 2 Duo T6600, P8600, P8700, or T9550
Display: 12.1" WXGA w/TrueLife
Memory: 2 GB single-channel DDR2 SDRAM @ 800 MHz, 2, 3, 4, or 8 GB of shared dual-channel DDR2 SDRAM @ 800 MHz
Optical Drive: 8X DVD+/-RW drive, Blu-ray disc combo drive
Graphics: Integrated Intel GMA 4500MHD
Security Hardware: Wave Encryption software
Storage: 1x SATA, 160 GB (5400 RPM), 250, 320, or 500 GB (7200 RPM w/Freefall sensor), or 250 GB encrypted HDD (7200RPM w/Free Fall Sensor and Wave software), 128 GB SSD
Wireless: Dell Wireless 1397 or 1510 mini card, Intel WiFi Link 5100, WiMAX/WiFi Link 5150, or 5300 mini card
Bluetooth: Dell Wireless 365 Bluetooth 2.0
Webcam: Integrated 1.3 MP webcam w/digital mic, optional free video chat software
Battery: 4-cell or 6-cell lithium-ion
Starting Price: $747

Vostro 1320 
The Vostro 1320 is Dell's 13.3" business laptop based on the Montevina platform.
CPU: Intel Celeron 900, Core 2 Duo T6600, P7550, P8600, P8700, or T9550
Display: 13.3" WXGA anti-glare, UltraSharp WXGA w/TrueLife
Memory: 2 GB single-channel DDR2 SDRAM @ 800 MHz, 2, 3, 4, or 8 GB of shared dual-channel DDR2 SDRAM @ 800 MHz
Optical Drive: 8X DVD+/-RW drive, Blu-ray disc combo drive
Graphics: Integrated Intel GMA 4500MHD, or NVIDIA GeForce 9300M GS
Security Hardware: Fingerprint reader w/DigitalPersona software, Wave Encryption software
Storage: 1x SATA, 120 GB (5400 RPM), 250 or 320 GB (7200 RPM w/Free Fall Sensor), or 250 GB encrypted hard drive (7200RPM w/Free Fall Sensor and Wave software), 128 GB SSD
Wireless: Dell Wireless 1397 or 1510 mini card, Intel WiFi Link 5100 or 5300 mini card, atherones
Bluetooth: Dell Wireless 355 Bluetooth 2.0
Webcam: Integrated 1.3 MP webcam w/digital mic, optional free video chat software
Battery: 4-cell, 6-cell, or 9-cell lithium-ion
Starting Price: $550

Vostro 1500 
The Vostro 1500 is Dell's 15.4" business laptop based on the Montevina platform. The design is based on Inspiron 1520 with a black finish.
CPU: Intel Celeron 900, Core 2 Duo T6600, P7550, P8600, P8700, or T9550
Display: 15.4" WXGA anti-glare LED, WXGA+ anti-glare, WXGA+ w/TrueLife
Memory: 2 GB single-channel DDR2 SDRAM @ 800 MHz, 2, 3, 4, or 8 GB of shared dual-channel DDR2 SDRAM @ 800 MHz
Optical Drive: 8X DVD+/-RW drive, Blu-ray disc combo drive
Graphics: Integrated Intel GMA 4500MHD, or NVIDIA GeForce 9300M GS
Security Hardware: Optional fingerprint reader w/DigitalPersona software, Wave Encryption software
Storage: 1x SATA, 160 GB (5400 RPM), 250 or 320 GB (7200 RPM w/Free Fall Sensor), or 250 GB encrypted hard drive (7200RPM w/Free Fall Sensor & Wave software), 128 GB SSD
Wireless: Dell Wireless 1397 or 1510 mini card, Intel WiFi Link 5100 or 5300 mini card
Bluetooth: Dell Wireless 355 Bluetooth 2.0
Webcam: Integrated 1.3 MP webcam w/digital mic, optional free video chat software
Battery: 4-cell, 6-cell, or 9-cell lithium ion battery

Vostro 1720 
The Vostro 1720 is Dell's 17" business laptop based on the Montevina platform. Note: X9000/X9100 may run very hot and not recommended. T9800 CPU recommended when equipped with nVidia GPU (Average CPU temp 85°C-89°C under load).

CPU: Intel Celeron 900, Core 2 Duo T6600, P7550, P8600, P8700, or T9550 (Up to Core 2 duo T9900/X9000/X9100 3.06 GHz 1066FSB E0; confirmed supported with PM45 Chipset, No Core 2 Quad(Q or QX series)
Display: 17" WXGA+ anti-glare LED, UltraSharp WUXGA w/TrueLife
Memory: 2 GB single channel DDR2 SDRAM @ 800 MHz, 2, 3, 4, or 8 GB of shared dual channel DDR2 SDRAM @ 800 MHz
Optical Drive: 8X DVD+/-RW drive, Blu-ray disc combo drive
Graphics: Integrated Intel GMA 4500MHD, or NVIDIA GeForce 9600M GS
Security Hardware: Fingerprint reader w/DigitalPersona software, Wave Encryption software
Storage: 1x SATA, 160 GB (5400 RPM), 250 or 320 GB (7200 RPM w/Free Fall Sensor), 250 GB encrypted hard drive (7200RPM w/Free Fall Sensor & Wave software), 128 GB SSD
Wireless: Dell Wireless 1397 or 1510 mini card, Intel WiFi Link 5100 or 5300 mini card
Bluetooth: Dell Wireless 355 Bluetooth 2.0
Battery: 6-cell or 8-cell lithium-ion
Starting Price: $599

Vostro A90 and A90n 

The Vostro A90 is Dell's 8.9" business netbook with similar platform as Dell Mini 9. The A90n offers Ubuntu Linux while the A90 offers Windows XP.
CPU: Intel Atom N270
Display: 8.9" WSVGA (1024×600) TN
Memory: 1 GB DDR2 SDRAM @ 533 MHz
Optical Drive: None
Graphics: Integrated Intel GMA 950
Storage: 16 GB solid state drive
Wireless: Wireless 802.11g card
Webcam: Integrated 0.3 MP
Battery: 4-cell (35 WHr) lithium-ion
Starting Price: $219 (Vostro A90n), $309 (Vostro A90)

Vostro V13 
The Vostro V13 is Dell's 13.3" business ultraportable with targeted at consumers looking for a budget business ultraportable. The Vostro V13 has a chassis design similar to the Dell Adamo, but it is very cheap at $449, though it ships with Ubuntu and clocks in at a 1.4 GHz Intel solo processor. The processor in the V13 cannot be customized, but the memory can. The base configuration ships with Ubuntu Linux version 9.04, but higher-end configurations ship with Windows 7.
CPU: Intel Celeron M 743, Core 2 Solo SU3500 or Core 2 Duo SU7300
Display: 13.3" LED-backlit widescreen (1366×768)
Memory: 2 GB or 4 GB DDR3 SDRAM @ 1066 MHz
Optical Drive: external 8X DVD+/-RW drive (option)
Graphics: Integrated Intel GMA X4500MHD
Storage: 1x SATA (250 GB (5400 RPM), 250 GB (7200 RPM) w/data encryption or 320 GB or 500 GB (7200 RPM))
Wireless: Dell Wireless 1397 802.11b/g or Intel PRO/Wireless 5100 802.11b/g/n
Webcam: Integrated 1.3 MP webcam
Battery: 6-cell (30 Whr) lithium ion
Starting Price: $449

Vostro 3300 
The Vostro 3300 is a laptop with a 13.3 inch widescreen display aimed at small business. Dell offers an Intel Core i3 or i5 processor with up to 6 GB DDR3 RAM. The chassis is made of aluminum. The operating system installed is Windows 7 32-bit/64-bit with an XP downgrade as an option. Discrete graphics is an option, and pricing starts at $599. This model has been discontinued by Dell.
CPU: Intel Core i3-350M, Core i5-430M, Core i5-450M or Core i5-520M
Display: 13.3" LED display (1366×768) with anti-glare
Memory: 2 GB, 3 GB, 4 GB, or 6 GB DDR3 @ 1066 MHz (up to 8 GB supported)
Optical Drive: Dual-Layer 8X DVD+/-RW Drive
Graphics: Intel GMA HD or Nvidia Geforce 310M, 512 MB
Security Hardware: Fingerprint reader w/DigitalPersona software (optional)
Storage: 1x SATA (250 GB @7200 RPM (encrypted drive optional), 320 GB (7200 RPM), 500 GB (7200 RPM))
Wireless: Dell Wireless 1520 b/g/n
Webcam: Integrated 2.0 MP webcam
Battery: 4-cell lithium-ion
Starting Price: $599

Vostro 3400 
The Vostro 3400 is a laptop with a 14-inch display aimed at small business. It offers updated Core i processors and larger batteries. Pricing starts at $549. Operating system options are the ones offered with the Vostro 3300.
CPU: Intel Core i3-370M or Core i5-450M
Display: 14" LED display (1366×768) with anti-glare
Memory: 3 or 4 GB DDR3 @ 1066 MHz (up to 8 GB supported)
Optical Drive: Dual-Layer 8X DVD+/-RW Drive
Graphics: Intel GMA HD or Nvidia Geforce 310M, 512 MB
Security Hardware: Fingerprint reader w/DigitalPersona software
Storage: 1x SATA 250 GB (7200 RPM) or 320 GB (7200 RPM)
Wireless: Dell Wireless 1520 b/g/n
Webcam: Integrated 1.0 MP (720p HD) webcam
Battery: 6-cell or 9-cell lithium-ion
Starting Price: $549

Vostro 3500 
The Vostro 3500 is a laptop with a 15.6 inch display aimed at small business. Operating system options are the ones offered with the Vostro 3300. In some countries Ubuntu can be chosen as the operating system. Vostro 3500 production is discontinued.
CPU: Intel Core i3-350M, Core i5-450M, i5-460M, i5-520M or Core i7-640M
Display: 15.6" LED display (1366×768) with anti-glare
Memory: 2, 3, or 4 GB @ 1066 MHz (up to 8 GB supported)
Chipset: Intel HM57
Optical Drive: Dual-Layer 8X DVD+/-RW Drive
Graphics: Intel GMA HD or Nvidia Geforce 310M, 512 MB
Security Hardware: Fingerprint reader w/DigitalPersona software
Storage: 1x SATA 320 GB, or 500 GB (7200 RPM)
Wireless: Dell Wireless 1520 Wireless-N Half Mini Card (a/b/n = Wi-Fi 4)
Webcam: Integrated 2.0 MP webcam

Vostro 3550 
The Vostro 3550 is a laptop with a 15.6 inch display aimed at small business. Operating system options are the same as those offered with the Vostro 3350.
CPU: Intel Core i3-2310M, Core i5-2410M or Core i7-2620M
Display: 15.6" LED display (1366×768) with anti-glare
Memory: PC3-10600 CL9 1.5 V modules - 2, 4 or 8 GB @ 1333 MHz (up to 8 GB officially, but works with 16GB as well)
Chipset: Intel HM67
Optical Drive: Dual-Layer 8X DVD+/-RW Drive
Graphics: Intel HD 3000 + optional ATI Radeon HD6630 (up to 1 GB VRAM)
Security Hardware: Fingerprint reader w/DigitalPersona software
Storage: 1x SATA 250 GB, 320 GB, or 500 GB (7200 RPM)
Wireless: Intel Wireless N-1030 b/g/n
Webcam: Integrated 2.0 MP webcam (UVC video)
Battery: 6-cell lithium-ion

Vostro 3560 
The Vostro 3560 is Dell's 15.6" business notebook.
CPU: Core i5-3210M, Core i5-3230M or Core i7-3612QM
Display: 15.6" LED display (1920×1080) TN
Memory: 4GB, 8 GB DDR3 SDRAM @ 1600 MHz
Chipset: Intel HM77
Optical Drive: DVD+/-RW DualLayer
Graphics: Intel HD 4000 + optional ATI Radeon HD7670M (up to 1 GB VRAM)
Storage: 1x SATA 500 GB (7200 RPM)
Wireless: Intel Centrino Wireless-N 2230 (b/g/n = Wi-Fi 4)
Webcam: Integrated 1.3 MP webcam
Battery: 6-cell lithium-ion

Vostro 3700 
The Vostro 3700 is a laptop with a 17.3 inch display aimed at small business. Pricing starts at $629. An Intel Core i7 processor is an option on the Vostro 3700, the only Vostro 3000 series laptop to offer this processor. Operating system options are the same as those offered with the Vostro 3300.
CPU: Intel Core i3-350M, Core i5-450M, i5-520M, or Core i7-720QM
Display: 17.3" LED display (1600×900) with anti-glare
Memory: 2GB, 3 GB, 4 GB DDR3 @ 1066 MHz (up to 8 GB supported)
Optical Drive: Dual-Layer 8X DVD+/-RW Drive
Graphics: Intel GMA HD or Nvidia Geforce 310M (512 MB) or Nvidia Geforce 330M GT (1024 MB)
Security Hardware: Fingerprint reader w/DigitalPersona software
Storage: 1× SATA (HDD 250 GB 7200 RPM, 320 GB 7200 RPM, 500 GB 7200 RPM)
Wireless: Dell Wireless 1520 b/g/n
Webcam: Integrated 2.0 MP webcam
Battery: 6-cell lithium-ion

Desktops

First Generation

General 

Vostro 200 Slim Tower – Uses Intel Pentium Dual Core or Core 2 Duo
Vostro 200 Mini Tower
Vostro 230 Mini Tower – Uses Intel Dual Core, Core 2 Duo and Core 2 Quad processors

Phase 2 Release 

Vostro 400 Mini Tower – Antec EarthWatts EA380 (same case as Vostro 200 Mini Tower)
Vostro 410 Tower – Uses the G33 chipset and features 3 external 5.25" drive bays.

Second Generation 

Vostro 220S Slim Tower – Updated DVD/CD/Blu-ray slot case
Vostro 220 Mini Tower
Vostro 420 Tower – Uses the G45 chipset.

Third Generation 

Vostro 230 Mini Tower/Desktop/Small Form Factor Desktop – Uses Intel Pentium/Core 2 Duo processors
Vostro 430 Mini Tower – Uses Nehalem Intel Core i5 and Core i7 processors.

Fourth generation 

 Vostro 260 Mini Tower – uses Sandy Bridge based Intel Pentium/Core i3/i5 processors.
 Vostro 460 Mini Tower – uses Sandy Bridge based Intel Core i5/i7 processors.

Fifth generation 

 Vostro 270 Mini Tower – uses Ivy Bridge based Intel Pentium/Core i3/i5 processors.
 Vostro 470 Mini Tower – uses Ivy Bridge based Intel Core i5/i7 processors.

Sixth generation 

 Dell Vostro 3900 – uses Haswell processors.

Seventh generation

Eight generation

Dell Vostro 3470/3471 Desktop Tower

 Width: 3.65" (92.7mm) 

 Depth: 11.54" (293mm) 

 Height: 11.42" (290mm) 

 Starting weight: 9.6 lbs (4.35 kg)
Chipset: Intel B360
Processor: Intel Core i3-8100 (4-Core/4-Thread, 6MB Cache, 3.6GHz)

 Operating system: Windows 10 Professional 64-bit English
 Memory: 4GB DDR4 2400Mhz (minimum); 32GB DDR4 2400Mhz (maximum)
Hard drive: 3.5" 1TB 7200RPM SATA Hard Drive
Bluetooth: 4.0, 2.4 GHz, 1x1
Graphics: Intel® UHD Graphics 630 with shared graphics memory
Starting price: $389.00-$739.00

Dell Vostro 3670/3671 Desktop Tower

 Width: 6.3" (160mm)

Depth: 11.39" (289.4mm)

Height: 14.71" (373.7mm)

Starting weight: 11.6 lbs (5.27 kg)
Chipset: Intel B360
Processor: Intel Core i3-9100 (minimum); Core i7-9700 (maximum)

Operating system: Windows 10 Professional 64-bit English
Memory: 4GB DDR4 2666Mhz (minimum); 32GB DDR4 2666Mhz (maximum)
Hard drive: 256GB M.2 PCIe NVMe Solid State Drive + 1TB 7200 rpm 3.5" SATA Hard Drive
Bluetooth: 4.0, 2.4 GHz, 1x1
Graphics: Intel® UHD Graphics 630; NVIDIA GeForce GTX 1050Ti with 4GB GDDR5 Graphics Memory
Starting price: $389.00-$579.00

Ninth generation

Dell Vostro 5090 Desktop 

 Processor: 9th Gen Intel Core i7-9700 (8-Core, 12MB Cache, up to 4.7GHz with Intel Turbo Boost Technology)
 Operating system: Windows 10 Pro 64-bit English
 Memory: 8GB DDR4 2666MHz (minimum);
 Graphics: NVIDIA GeForce GTX 1660Ti 6GB GDDR6
Starting price: $699.00-$1349.00
Dimensions: Mini-tower version of Vostro 3000 series, i.e., no expansion slots

Other Desktops 

Dell Vostro A100
Dell Vostro A180
Dell Vostro 270, 270S; 2012-2013

History

Notebooks and laptops 
 10 July 2007: 1000, 1400, 1500, 1700 (Windows XP or Vista)
 18 December 2007: 1200 (Windows XP or Vista)
 1 May 2008: 1310, 1510 (Windows XP or Vista)
 15 May 2008: 1710 (Windows XP or Vista)
 1 July 2009: 1220 (Windows XP and Windows 7)
 23 October 2015: Vostro 14 5000 (Ubuntu, Windows 8.1, Windows 10)

Desktops 
 10 July 2007: 200 (Windows XP or Vista)
 2015: Vostro 3900 (Windows 8.1)
2016: Vostro 3468, 3470, 3668, 3670 (Windows 10, Ubuntu)

See also 

 Dell Inspiron laptop computers
 Dell Precision
 DellEMC
 Dell Technologies
 Dell Inspiron desktop computers
 Dell XPS

References

External links

Dell Vostro US
Dell's U.K. Vostro Site
Dell Malaysia Vostro laptops

Vostro
Consumer electronics brands
Computer-related introductions in 2013
Business laptops